Luc Petit (born 1962) is an artistic director, designer and creator of shows, events, exhibitions and museum spaces. He's mostly known for his shows in remarquable places such as cathedrals, castles, monuments and more like "Viser la lune" in the streets of La Louvière, Inferno on waterloo's battlefield or even the Noël des Cathédrales tour each years in Belgian's cathedrals.

Early life
He began his training in television directing. He studied cinematography at the IAD in Louvain-la-Neuve.

Art

After his academic training, he began to work at No Télé (a local television station in Tournai). During this audiovisual involvement he met Jean Michel Jarre, Jean Rochefort and Gérard Depardieu.

Luc Petit has collaborated with organisations in the entertainment and event industry including the festival "Juste pour Rire", Cirque du Soleil, Jean-Paul Gaultier and Disney.

He worked for Franco Dragone for many years, working on productions including Décrocher la lune, the Disney Cinema Parade, and the opening ceremony of EuroFoot 2000 in Brussels.
In 2012, Luc Petit and his team conceptualized the musical, inspired by the story of Peter Pan, mixing dance, singing, acrobatics, lighting effects and videos. This show was the biggest video mapping show for arenas. He toured in Europe, Dubai and Singapore.

In 2014, he created  Texas Aggies go to war, celebrating the 70th anniversary of the Battle of the Bulge.  The show, was awarded the Trophée de l'Evénement Exceptionnel in Cannes.

In  2015, he designed and directed Inferno, a show made for the opening ceremony of the bicentenary of the Battle of Waterloo, for which he received the "Best Creative Director" award at the EuBEA Festival in Sevilla. The celebration events in Waterloo, made in collaboration with Vo Communication and Verhulst&Partners, were also given the Best cultural event award, the best public event and the European best event award 2015.

A couple of months later, he directed the biggest urban opera in the world, Décrocher la Lune; there are more than 35000 people in a one-kilometer stage in La Louvière, Belgium. For this, he was awarded at the BEA Festival with a Silver Award. He also received at the EUBEA Festival the golden award for Best Cultural Event and Best Ceremony Event, a silver award for the Best European Event 2016 and a bronze award for Luc Petit CREATION as an event agency. In April 2017, he received an award for the Best show in the category "Live Event Spectacular on a Limited Budget" at the Themed Entertainment Association gala.

He is internationally known and developing different projects for Wanda Group Entertainment in China.

Since July 2018, the visitors of the “Caves of Han” can visit this permanent installation named ORIGIN the most magnificent underground show in the world including sound, light and the latest technology of video mapping and lasers.

Moreover, since 2015, Luc PETIT and his international team worked on a unique permanent show in Qingdao - China, the QING SHOW. The Grand Premiere in April 2019 was a real success as Luc PETIT directed the show based on the well-known Chinese legend of the Eight Immortals.

Together with Michel TEHEUX, he created a non-profit organization NOCTURNALES, a new concept of heritage operas, which highlight the architectural wealth of cathedrals and patrimonial buildings. The tour NOEL DES CATHEDRALES and recently, the FÉERIES DE BELOEIL are some of his creations.

Shows

2000:
 Euro 2000 (show director)
 Décrocher la lune 1 (La Louvière, Belgique) (show director)
2001:
 Chapeau Europa
2002:
 Disney Cinema Parade 
 Décrocher la lune 2 (La Louvière, Belgique) (show director)
 Au fil de l'homme
2005:
 Zarabanda
2006:
 Bois du Cazier
 Décrocher la lune 3 (La Louvière, Belgique) (show director)
 Les Imaginaires: Waremme (show director)
 Belgacom Xmas party
2007:
 Crown Macau opening
 Fortissim'o
 Défilé Les Petits Riens
 Natan
 Les Nocturnales de Noël: Dites-moi les Anges (show director)
2008:
 Mobistar
 Nespresso Lattissima
 Bilbao Celestial urban opera
 Le Grand Charivari
 Plaisirs d'hiver
 Belgacom Phi
 Les Nocturnales de Noël: Et le Ciel rêva de la Terre
2009:
 Nespresso Citiz
 Thalys
 Défilé Mais il est où le Soleil ? 10 ans(show director)
 Jardins de feu (show director)
 Nespresso Avenches
 Juste pour Rire: Le Monde de Victor
 Besix 100 ans
 Le Grand Baiser
 Décrocher la lune 4 (La Louvière, Belgique) (show director)
 Orange Expo Cédric Les Nocturnales de Noël: Quand le Ciel et la Terre s'embrassèrent (show director)
2010: 
 Les Imaginaires: Pour que les pierres deviennent feu Fashion show: Mais il est où le soleil? Amway 15 years
 Juste pour Rire: Pink Cendrillon & Le Grand Bisou Les Nocturnales de Noël: Les Carillons du Ciel (show director)
2011:
 Fashion show: Mais il est où le soleil? (show director) 
 Metinvest 5 years
 Juste pour Rire: Pinkarnaval Telenet
 Besix: 100 years
2012:
 Doha Les Nocturnales, Huy Amway
 Décrocher la lune 5 (La Louvière, Belgique)(show director)
 Peter Pan(Conceptor & Show Director)
2013: 
 Story of a Fort: Legacy of a Nation (show director)
 Juste Pour Rire: Terra Karnaval & Le Grand Bisou Private birthday in Roma at Cinecittà (conceptor and show director)
2014:
 "Texas Aggies Go to War", a commemorating show in the Mardasson (show director)
2015:
 "Discovery of a new world", Harbin China for Wanda Group (show director)
 "Inferno", the opening show of the bicentenary of the Waterloo's battle. (show director)
 "Décrocher la lune 6", La Louvière, Belgique (show director)
2017:
 Les Sonneurs de Noël  : heritage opera in Wallonie tour & Brussels - Belgium / Lille - France
2018:
  "Origin" : spectacle son et lumière permanent aux Grottes de Han 
 Les Féeries de Beloeil 1st edition : heritage opera in the Castle of Beloeil - Belgium
 Le Voyage des Mages  : heritage opera in Wallonie tour & Brussels - Belgium
2019 :
 Qing Show  : permanent show in Qingdao - China
 Les Féeries de Beloeil 2sd edition : heritage opera in the Castle of Beloeil - Belgium
 Les Routes de la Liberté  : commemoration show in Bastogne - Belgium
 L'Horloger de Noël  : heritage opera in Wallonie tour - Belgium

Bibliography
  Yves Vasseur, Franco Dragone: une part de rêve, Éd. Luc Pire, 2006, P144
  Musée de l'orfèvrerie de la fédération Wallonie-Bruxelles, Faste et Intimité, Une exposition sensorielle dans les coulisses du XVIIIe siècle
  Muriel Chapuis, Les carnets d'événements, 2013, P70, Sous l'inspiration de ... Luc PETIT 
  Building Experience, 1990–2009, Ed. Yin books, Volume 2, P 282–291

References

External links 
  Official website
  Luc Petit CREATION

Interviews 
 RTL-TVI : Face à Face : Luc Petit & Geert Allaert
 ETVONWEB : Luc Petit & Peter Pan

1962 births
Living people
Belgian designers